Lacaze (meaning the house) is a commune in the Tarn department in southern France.

Geography
The river Dadou forms part of the commune's northern border. The village lies on the banks of the Gijou, which flows westward through the commune, then forms most of its south-western border.

See also
Communes of the Tarn department

References

Communes of Tarn (department)